The Cintractiellaceae are a family of rare smut fungi in the order Ustilaginales. At present the family contains two genera and four species, which all infect sedges (Cyperaceae).  The species are Tolyposporium ehrenbergii, Cintractiella lamii (found in Indonesia), C. diplasiae (found in Brazil and Venezuela), and C. kosraensis (found in Micronesia).

References

Basidiomycota families
Ustilaginomycotina